Robert A. Starr (born December 17, 1942) is an American politician from Vermont who currently serves as a Democratic member of the Vermont State Senate. He has represented the Essex-Orleans senate district since 2004. He had previously spent a quarter-century in the Vermont House of Representatives.

Biography
Robert Starr was born in Hartford, Connecticut, on December 17, 1942. He has lived in Troy, Vermont since moving there in 1944. He received an Associate Degree in agriculture from Vermont Technical College.

Starr is married to his wife Anita Cadieux. The couple has one son.

He is a professional truck driver. Starr is president of his own transportation company. He is director of the Vermont Truck and Bus Association.

Public life

Congress
Starr was elected to the Vermont House of Representatives in 1978 and served there until 2004. From 1985 to 2000, he chaired the House Agriculture Committee. He was elected to the Vermont Senate in 2004 and was re-elected two years later.

Other government service
Troy school board
Orleans-Essex North Supervisory Union, school board
Troy zoning board
Troy planning commission
Troy board of civil authority
Troy town moderator
North Country Union High School moderator
Trustee, Vermont State Colleges

Goodyear Highway Hero award
On September 14, 2005, there was an incident near Trois-Rivières, Quebec involving Starr. While driving in a truck, the pavement collapsed and Starr's vehicle as well as another passenger car driven by a woman went off the road. The woman's car caught fire and she was trapped in it. Starr was able to rescue the driver. For this effort he was later awarded the Goodyear Highway Hero award.

See also

Members of the Vermont Senate, 2005-2006 session
Members of the Vermont Senate, 2007-2008 session

References

External links
Vermont Senate Biographies

Democratic Party members of the Vermont House of Representatives
Democratic Party Vermont state senators
Essex County, Vermont
1942 births
Living people
People from Troy, Vermont
21st-century American politicians